Harry Lester Usher (March 6, 1939 – June 22, 2000) was an American attorney who was the second and last commissioner of the United States Football League (USFL). He was also the executive vice president and general manager of the Los Angeles Olympic Organizing Committee (LAOOC), which oversaw the business operations of the 1984 Summer Olympics. His legal expertise was in entertainment law.

Early years
Usher was born on March 6, 1939, in Jersey City, New Jersey. His father died shortly after his birth. He entered Brown University on a scholarship, graduated as a Phi Beta Kappa in 1961, and later helped many California-based students attend the university. He then matriculated at Stanford Law School, where he was editor of its Law Review. He earned his law degree in 1964.

United States Football League
Usher was named the commissioner of the United States Football League on January 15, 1985, succeeding Chet Simmons who had resigned the previous day. After signing a three-year contract, he inherited a league that continued to incur heavy financial losses. ESPN had renewed its network television deal for three years. ABC, knowing that the USFL was moving to an autumn schedule in 1986 in direct competition with the more-established National Football League (NFL), decided to televise games for only the 1985 season.

Death
Usher had two open-heart surgeries, the first in 1975 when he was only 36. The second occurred at St. John's Hospital and Health Center in Santa Monica, California on January 9, 1986. He had checked into the hospital complaining of chest pains nineteen days earlier on December 21, 1985. He died at age 61 in Secaucus, New Jersey on June 22, 2000. He had suffered a heart attack while exercising at the AmeriSuites Hotel gym, also in Secaucus. He was on a consulting mission for General Electric Financial Services Corp.

References

1939 births
2000 deaths
American entertainment industry businesspeople
Businesspeople from Jersey City, New Jersey
Brown University alumni
Stanford Law School alumni
United States Football League executives
20th-century American businesspeople
20th-century American lawyers